Kamarcheh-ye Sofla (also Romanized as Kamarcheh-ye Soflá; also known as Kamarcheh and Kamarchehhā) is a village in Jolgeh-ye Musaabad Rural District, in the Central District of Torbat-e Jam County, Razavi Khorasan Province, Iran. At the 2006 census, its population was 199, in 37 families.

References 

Populated places in Torbat-e Jam County